Surrey Cricket Board played in List A cricket matches between 1999 and 2002. This is a list of the players who appeared in those matches.

Sam Andrews (2001): SJ Andrews
Sairaj Bahutule (2002): SV Bahutule
Mark Bainbridge (1999–2001): MR Bainbridge
Aidan Baker (2002): AF Baker
Gareth Batty (2000): GJ Batty
Ian Bishop (1999): IE Bishop
Richard Bowers (2001–2002): RB Bowers
Noel Brett (2002): NA Brett
Chris Bullen (1999–2001): CK Bullen
Michael Carberry (1999): MA Carberry
Timothy Carter (1999–2001): TJ Carter
Rikki Clarke (2001): R Clarke
James Clutterbuck (1999): J Clutterbuck
Graham Crawford (1999): GA Crawford
Efren Cruz (2001–2002): EP Cruz
Zander de Bruyn (2000–2001): Z de Bruyn
Bob Falconer (1999): RJ Falconer
Neil Farnsworth (2000): NJ Farnsworth
Quentin Ferreira (1999): Q Ferreira
John Fry (1999–2002): JAW Fry
David Gorrod (2001–2002): DE Gorrod
Max Hall (2001–2002): MP Hall
Tim Hodgson (2000–2001): TP Hodgson
Andrew Hollingsworth (2001–2002): AP Hollingsworth
Peter James (1999–2000): PM James
Richard Johnson (2001–2002): RK Johnson
Neil Kendrick (1999): NM Kendrick
Mark Kenlock (1999–2000): SG Kenlock
Richard Mansfield (2001–2002): RJ Mansfield
Kervin Marc (2001): K Marc
Gary Martin (2002): GRE Martin
Tim Murtagh (2001): TJ Murtagh
Scott Newman (2001): SA Newman
Joe Porter (2002): JJ Porter
Giles Puckle (2001): GD Puckle
Philip Sampson (2000): PJ Sampson
Oliver Slipper (2000): OM Slipper
Jonathan Wileman (1999–2001): JR Wileman

References

Surrey Cricket Board